The Van Cleef Memorial Medal was established in 1970 by Dr. Van Cleef, in honor and memory of his wife, Frieda. This medal, designed by Joseph DiLorenzo is awarded by the American Geographical Society to honor “scholars who have done outstanding original work in the field of urban geography, preferable, though not necessarily in applied rather than theoretical aspects”.

History
Dr. Eugene Van Cleef was a Professor Emeritus of Geography at Ohio State University. He holds the distinction of having taught the first course in urban geography at an American university. Throughout his career Van Cleef sought to apply geography to the business world. With his book, 'Trade Centers and Trade Routes', Van Cleef became the first American Geographer to publish a book on urban themes.

Recipients
The following people received the award in the year specified:

 1970: John R. Borchert
 1974: Harold Rose
 1985: Jacqueline Beaujeu-Garnier
 1987: James E. Vance, Jr.
 1999: Susan Hanson
 2014: Edward Malecki 
 2022: Joe T. Darden

See also

 List of geography awards

References

External links
 Official website

Awards of the American Geographical Society
Awards established in 1970